Elara may refer to:

 Elara (mythology), mother of the giant Tityos in Greek mythology
 Elara (moon), a moon of Jupiter named after Elara
 Elara (timeshare), a building on the Las Vegas Strip in Las Vegas, Nevada, U.S
 Ellalan, or Eḷāra, a member of the Tamil Chola dynasty and monarch of the Anuradhapura Kingdom
 "Elara", a song from the 2012 album Soundtrack for the Voices in My Head Vol. 02 by Celldweller
 Elara Pictures, an American film production company
 Chery A5, a Chinese compact sedan, sold in Ukraine as the Chery Elara

See also
 Elarra, a character in the roleplay game Final Fantasy Record Keeper